Greater Than a Crown is a 1925 American silent romantic comedy film directed by Roy William Neill and starring Edmund Lowe, Dolores Costello, and Margaret Livingston. It was based on a 1918 novel The Lady from Long Acre by the British writer Victor Bridges. The novel had previously been adapted as the 1921 film The Lady from Longacre.

Synopsis
An American man in London assists an escaped Princess who has fled to England to escape a royal marriage. After she is kidnapped and taken home, he goes to rescue her with the assistance of his English actress friend.

Cast

Preservation
A print of Greater Than a Crown is preserved in a foreign film archive.

References

Bibliography
 Solomon, Aubrey. The Fox Film Corporation, 1915-1935: A History and Filmography. McFarland, 2011.

External links

1925 films
1925 romantic comedy films
American silent feature films
Fox Film films
Films directed by Roy William Neill
Films set in London
Remakes of American films
Films based on British novels
American romantic comedy films
1920s English-language films
1920s American films
Silent romantic comedy films
Silent American comedy films